Among those who were born in the London Borough of Islington, or have dwelt within the borders of the modern borough are (alphabetical order):

Douglas Adams, writer, lived on Arlington Avenue and Duncan Terrace, later renting his house to comedian Angus Deayton
Adewale Akinnuoye-Agbaje, actor born in Islington
Lily Allen, singer and daughter of actor Keith Allen
Nadia Almada, first transsexual winner of Big Brother
Tash Aw, Whitbread Book Award-winning author
Binnie Barnes, actress, born there, 1903.
Julian Barratt and Julia Davis
Nina Bawden, author, has lived in Islington for many years
James Beck, actor, was born there
Tony Blair, former Prime Minister of the UK, lived at 1 Richmond Crescent before moving to Downing Street
Helena Bonham Carter, actress
Jay Bothroyd, footballer 
Jim Broadbent, actor, lives in the area 
Jonny Buckland, lead guitarist of the band Coldplay
Alexandra Burke, singer and winner of The X Factor
Kathy Burke, actor and director, lives in Islington
Elaine Lordan, actor, appeared on EastEnders as Lynne Slater
Asa Butterfield, actor
Claude Callegari, English YouTuber
Neve Campbell, Canadian actor
Jimmy Carr, comedian
Natalie Cassidy, actress, was born and raised in Islington
John Chapple, one of the last Field Marshals of Great Britain and Governor of Gibraltar
J. Smeaton Chase (1864–1923), travel writer and photographer who wrote about California; buried in Palm Springs, California
Caroline Chisholm, lived at 32 Charlton Place
Sorcha Cusack, actor
Charles Dance, OBE, actor, screenwriter and director
Phil Daniels, actor
Alan Davies, actor and comedian, Jonathan Creek and Bob and Rose, lives in Highbury
Maya Delilah, singer-songwriter and guitarist
Dido, singer, born in Islington and owns a property there
Daisy Edgar-Jones, actress
Colin Firth, Academy Award-winning actor
Edwin Flack (1873–1935), athlete and tennis player
Jonathan Fortune, Sheffield United F.C. footballer, born in Islington
John Foxx, electronic musician and first Ultravox singer, lived there in the 1970s
Peaches Geldof, daughter of Bob Geldof and Paula Yates
John Glascock (1951–1979), (musician), bassist of Carmen from 1971 to 1974 and Jethro Tull from 1975 to 1979, born and raised in Islington
Kate Greenaway, children's writer and book illustrator, lived at 147 Upper Street for 20 years before moving to Holloway
Jonas Grimås, film and television director
Teriy Keys, music executive, entrepreneur, founder and co-chief executive officer of R.O.A.D. Group
Tony Hadley, lead singer, Spandau Ballet, born in Islington in 1960
Edmund Halley, Astronomer Royal and discoverer of Halley's Comet lived in Islington (exact location unknown) from 1665
Naomie Harris, actress 
Charlie G. Hawkins, actor, Darren Miller in EastEnders
Isabel Hilton, journalist and broadcaster
William Hogarth, artist, born in Bartholomew Close in 1697, spent his early years in Islington
Darryl Hunt, bass player, The Pogues
Edward Irving, founder of the Catholic Apostolic Church, lived in Claremont Square
Yusuf Islam, aka Cat Stevens, musician
Ian Jack, writer and journalist
Valda James, first black woman elected to Islington Council and the first black mayor of Islington
Boris Johnson, MP Former Mayor of London
Semothy Jones, songwriter/record producer, grew up in Holloway
Churchill Julius, lived at 44 Milner Square in 1881, vicar of Holy Trinity Islington, went on to become Archbishop of New Zealand
George Julius, lived at 44 Milner Square in 1881, invented the world's first automatic totalisator
Noah Jupe, actor in the movie Wonder. 
Gary Kemp and Martin Kemp of Spandau Ballet, born in Islington, lived on Elmore Street
Skandar Keynes, actor The Chronicles of Narnia
Danny King, wrote The Burglar Diaries and Thieves Like Us
Charles Lamb, writer, lived in Chapel Street from 1796, at 64 Duncan Terrace and also in Colebrook Row
Edward Lear, writer, poet, artist, born in Islington
Heath Ledger, lived in Roman way, Islington while filming his final film in 2007 before his death
Vladimir Lenin, lived at 30 Holford Square from 1902 and later at 16 Percy Circus
Leona Lewis, singer
Louise Lombard, actor
Arthur Louis, singer, lived at 12 Richmond Avenue in the 1970s
Louisa Lytton, actress
Marianne Majerus, photographer
Dean Mason, association football player
Princess Martha Louise of Norway lived in Islington 2012-2014
James McAvoy, actor
Cameron McKenna, television announcer and radio broadcaster
Doug McClure, former professional footballer
Scott Mills, Radio 1 DJ, lives in Islington
Andrew Mitchell, Secretary of State for International Development in the British Government (from May 2010)
Ugo Monye, Harlequins and English rugby union player
Ivor Moreton (1908–1984), pianist and singer, born in Barnsbury
Robert Muchamore, author of the CHERUB series
Sheree Murphy, actor born in Islington
Scott Neal, actor, Beautiful Thing and PC Luke Ashton in The Bill
Robin Nicholson CBE, Architect
Edmund John Niemann, 19th century landscape artist born in Islington
Ed O'Brien, guitarist, Radiohead
Joe Orton, playwright, lived and was murdered in a flat at 25 Noel Road
George Orwell, writer, lived at 50 Lawford Road and in a flat at 27B Canonbury Square
Nicholas Owen, newsreader and broadcaster, was born in Islington and raised in Reigate, Surrey
David Oyelowo, actor, grew up in Islington and attended City and Islington College.
Stephen Poliakoff, playwright
Su Pollard, actor, Hi Di Hi
Anna Popplewell, actress The Chronicles of Narnia
Jacob Post, religious writer.
Sir Walter Raleigh, writer, poet, courtier and explorer lived in Upper Street between 1575 and 1581
Simon Rattle, conductor, lived in Islington for a period
Linda Robson, actor, Birds of a Feather
Francis Ronalds, inventor of the electric telegraph, lived in Canonbury and then Highbury Terrace in the period 1789–1813.
Alfred Ronalds, fly fishing author, was born at 1 Highbury Terrace in 1802.
Ronnie Ronalde, music hall performer famous for his singing, whistling, yodelling and imitations of bird song was born and raised in Islington
Jon Ronson, author, columnist, documentary maker
Salman Rushdie, writer, lived in Islington for a period
Dana, winner of the 1970 Eurovision Song Contest
Jacob Scipio, actor
Kaya Scodelario, actress
Andy Serkis, actor, The Lord of the Rings film trilogy
Martin Shaw, actor, Ray Doyle and Judge John Deed, lived in Noel Road, including while starring in The Professionals
Ben Shephard, TV presenter, lived in Islington 2001–2004
Sir Charles Scott Sherrington, neurologist, pathologist, bacteriologist, born in Islington
Sid Smith, novelist, journalist, lives in Islington
Nicky Spesh, rapper, lives in Islington
Mark Strong, actor born in Islington 
Shana and Joe Swash, Eastenders actors
Ann Taylor (1782–1866), poet, writer, born in Islington 
Sir Charles Todd FRS (1826–1910), astronomer
Laura Trevelyan, international BBC newsreader and correspondent, born in Islington, now resides in New York City
Ms. Triniti (born 1974), recording artist, born in Islington
Peter Vowell, schoolteacher, executed for high treason
Frank Warren, boxing promoter, born in Islington
Emma Watson, actor
Samuel West, actor
Kenneth Williams (1926–1988), actor and comedian, born at 11 Bingfield Street, lived in Cromer Street
Kate Winslet, actress
Elizabeth Wilkinson (1700s), English bare-knuckle boxing champion, known to be the first female boxer
Edgar Wright, film director.
Hugo Young (1938-2003), journalist, lived in Milner Square from the late 1960s until the mid-1980s

See also
Islington prisons – for a listing of persons imprisoned at the HM Prison Pentonville

References

Islington